"It's Your World" is a song by American recording artist Jennifer Hudson featuring fellow singer R. Kelly, recorded for her third studio album JHUD (2014). It was written by Kelly and produced by DJ Terry Hunter. Released worldwide on July 8, 2014 as the album's third single, Hudson sang it for the first time at BET Awards 2014 on June 29, 2014. No music video was made for the single. The song was nominated for a Grammy Award for Best R&B Performance. In 2019, Hudson removed "It's Your World" from all streaming platforms and stopped performing it in support of women who had come forward with stories of abuse from Kelly.

Background
"It's Your World" was written by frequent Hudson collaborator R. Kelly, while production was handled by DJ Terry Hunter. Commenting on its composition, Hudson wrote on Twitter: "R. Kelly had to be thinking about Aretha Franklin's "Think" when he created my song "It's Your World". It's a vocal marathon!"

Live performances
The song has been performed by Jennifer Hudson on numerous stages and live shows like BET Awards 2014, The Voice, America's Got Talent, Today Show and Steve Harvey. Kelly has not as of yet performed this song live with Hudson or solo.

Track listing
Digital download
"It's Your World " (featuring R. Kelly) – 5:18

Credits and personnel
Credits adapted from AllMusic.

Jennifer Hudson – Creative Director, Primary Artist
Robert Kelly – Composer, Featured Artist
Terry Hunter – Executive Producer

Charts
For the week ending August 24, 2014, "It's Your World" debuted at number 48 on the Hot R&B/Hip-Hop Airplay.

Weekly charts

Year-end charts

References

2014 singles
2014 songs
Jennifer Hudson songs
R. Kelly songs
Songs written by R. Kelly
RCA Records singles